The 1914 Tennessee gubernatorial election was held on November 3, 1914. Democratic nominee Thomas Clarke Rye defeated incumbent Republican Ben W. Hooper with 53.55% of the vote.

General election

Candidates
Thomas Clarke Rye, Democratic
Ben W. Hooper, Republican

Results

References

1914
Tennessee
Gubernatorial